Sweet Sixteen is a 1928 American silent drama film directed by Scott Pembroke and starring Helen Foster, Gertrude Olmstead and Gladden James. It was distributed by the independent Rayart Pictures, the forerunner of Monogram Pictures.

Synopsis
When her younger sister Cynthia becomes entangled with the caddish Howard De Hart, Patricia tries to persuade her away from his clutches. When this is no good she decides to break them up even if it means compromising her own reputation at the risk of losing her own boyfriend.

Cast
 Helen Foster as Cynthia Perry
 Gertrude Olmstead as 	Patricia Perry
 Gladden James as 	Howard De Hart
 Lydia Yeamans Titus as 	Grandma Perry
 Reginald Sheffield as Tommy Lowell
 William H. Tooker as Patrick Perry

References

Bibliography
 Connelly, Robert B. The Silents: Silent Feature Films, 1910-36, Volume 40, Issue 2. December Press, 1998.

External links
 

1920s American films
1928 films
1928 drama films
1920s English-language films
American silent feature films
Silent American drama films
American black-and-white films
Films directed by Scott Pembroke
Rayart Pictures films